Tolimkhan-e Sofla (also Romanized as Tolīmkhān-e Soflá; also known as Tāzeh Kand-e Towlīm Khān and Towlīm Khān-e Pā'īn) is a village in Chaybasar-e Jonubi Rural District, in the Central District of Maku County, West Azerbaijan Province, Iran. At the 2006 census, its population was 97 in 20 families.

References 

Populated places in Maku County